Carlos Eduardo Kenig (born November 25, 1953, in Buenos Aires, Argentina) is an Argentine American mathematician and Louis Block Distinguished Service Professor in the Department of Mathematics at the University of Chicago. He is known for his work in harmonic analysis and partial differential equations. 
He is the current President of the International Mathematical Union.

Career 
Kenig obtained his PhD at the University of Chicago in 1978 under the supervision of Alberto Calderón. Since then, he has held positions at Princeton University and the University of Minnesota before returning to the University of Chicago in 1985. He has done extensive work in elliptic and dispersive partial differential equations. He is a member of the National Academy of Sciences since 2014. His students include Zhongwei Shen, Kin Ming Hui,  Gigliola Staffilani and Panagiota Daskalopoulos.

Awards and honors 
 Salem Prize, 1984 
 Invited speaker, 1986 International Congress of Mathematicians (and 2002)
 Elected Fellow of the American Academy of Arts and Sciences, 2002
 Bôcher Memorial Prize, 2008
 Plenary speaker, 2010 International Congress of Mathematicians
 Elected Member of the National Academy of Sciences, 2014 

Kenig was elected President of the International Mathematical Union in July 2018.

References

External links
Homepage at the University of Chicago

20th-century American mathematicians
21st-century American mathematicians
University of Chicago faculty
University of Chicago alumni
1953 births
Living people
Fellows of the American Academy of Arts and Sciences
Fellows of the American Mathematical Society
Members of the United States National Academy of Sciences

Argentine mathematicians
20th-century Argentine mathematicians
Argentine emigrants to the United States
People from Buenos Aires
Presidents of the International Mathematical Union